Bella Donna is a 1934 British drama film directed by Robert Milton and starring Conrad Veidt, Mary Ellis and Cedric Hardwicke.  The film is based on the 1909 novel Bella Donna by Robert Hichens which had previously been made into a 1923 American silent film Bella Donna starring Pola Negri. A further American adaptation Temptation starring Merle Oberon was produced in 1946.

The film's art direction was by James A. Carter. It was made at Twickenham Studios. It is still extant unlike a number of Twickenham's productions from the decade.

Cast
 Mary Ellis as Mary Chepstow Amine  
 John Stuart as Nigel Armine  
 Cedric Hardwicke as Dr. Meyer Isaacson 
 Conrad Veidt as Mahmoud Baroudi  
 Jeanne Stuart as Lady Zoe Harwich  
 Rodney Millington as Ibrahim Achmed  
 Eve South as The Dancing Girl  
 Michael Shepley as Dr, Baring-Hartley

See also
Bella Donna (1915)
Bella Donna (1923)
Temptation (1946)

References

Bibliography
 Low, Rachael. Filmmaking in 1930s Britain. George Allen & Unwin, 1985.
 Wood, Linda. British Films, 1927-1939. British Film Institute, 1986.

External links

1934 films
British drama films
1934 drama films
Films directed by Robert Milton
Films shot at Twickenham Film Studios
Films set in Egypt
Films set in London
British black-and-white films
Films based on British novels
British remakes of American films
Sound film remakes of silent films
1930s English-language films
1930s British films